The 1973 All-Southwest Conference football team consists of American football players chosen, at each position, as the best players in the Southwest Conference during the 1973 NCAA Division I football season.  The selectors for the 1973 season included the Associated Press (AP) and the United Press International (UPI).

Texas running back Roosevelt Leaks set the conference single-season record with 1,415 rushing yards in 1973 and was selected as the player of the year by the AP and the offensive player of the year by the UPI.

The AP also conducted balloting for coach of the year (Jim Carlen, Texas Tech) and newcomer of the year (Larry Isaac, Texas Tech). And the UPI selected a defensive player of the year (linebacker Ed Simonini, Texas A&M) and a freshman player of the year (quarterback David Walker, Texas A&M).

All Southwest selections

Offense

Quarterbacks
 Joe Barnes, Texas Tech (AP-1, UPI-1)

Running backs
 Roosevelt Leaks, Texas (AP-1, UPI-1)
 Dickey Morton, Arkansas (AP-1, UPI-1)
 Alvin Maxson, SMU (AP-1)
 Mike Luttrell, TCU (UPI-1)

Tight ends
 Gary Butler, Rice (AP-1, UPI-1)

Split ends
 Charles Dancer, Baylor (AP-1, UPI-1)

Tight ends
 Andre Tillman, Texas Tech (AP-1, UPI-1)

Offensive tackles
 Bob Simmons, Texas (AP-1, UPI-1)
 Tom Ferguson, Texas Tech (AP-1, UPI-1)

Offensive guards
 Don Crosslin, Texas (AP-1, UPI-1)
 Dennis Allen, Texas Tech (AP-1, UPI_1)

Centers
 Bill Wyman, Texas (AP-1, UPI-1)

Kickers
 Don Grimes, Texas Tech (UPI-1)

Defense

Defensive ends
 Malcolm Minnick, Texas (AP-1)
 Ivan Jordan, Arkansas (AP-1)
 Jon Rhiddlehoover, Arkansas (UP-1 [line])
 Charlie Davis, TCU (UPI-1 [line])

Defensive tackles
 Ecomet Burley, Texas Tech (AP-1, UPI-1 [line])
 Doug English, Texas (AP-1, UPI-1 [line])

Nose guard
 David Knaus, Texas Tech (AP-1)

Linebackers
 Ed Simonini, Texas A&M (AP-1, UPI-1)
 Danny Rhodes, Arkansas (AP-1, UPI-1)
 Dede Terveen, TCU (UPI-1)

Defensive backs
 Bruce Henley, Rice (AP-1, UPI-1)
 Jay Arnold, Texas (AP-1, UPI-1)
 Danny Willis, Texas Tech (AP-1, UPI-1)
 Kenneth Wallace, Texas Tech (AP-1, UPI-1)

Key
AP = Associated Press

UPI = United Press International

See also
1973 College Football All-America Team

References

All-Southwest Conference
All-Southwest Conference football teams